LHA 120-S 79 is an RV Tauri variable star located in the Large Magellanic Cloud, located about 163,000 light years away in the constellation of Dorado, with a period of 37.203 days. The star is extremely hot for a star of its type, as its temperature is over 10,000 K, and it is hot enough to be classified as a B-type blue giant, as well as being the hottest star of its type in the LMC. LHA 120-S 79 is also extremely luminous, at over 14,000 L☉, and it is the most luminous known star of its type in the galaxy. 

However, the star may be less luminous than it seems, as its spectral energy distribution is contaminated by a very nearby star, 2MASS J05044388−6858371, which is also a long-period variable star and is just 8 arcseconds from LHA 120-S 79.

Notes

References 

RV Tauri variables
Large Magellanic Cloud
B-type giants
Dorado (constellation)